The Diocese of Lake Rukwa is a south-western diocese in the Anglican Church of Tanzania: its current bishop is the Rt Revd Mathayo Kasagara whose seat is at the newly constructed Christ the King Cathedral.

Notes

Anglican Church of Tanzania dioceses
Rukwa Region
Anglican realignment dioceses